The men's shot put event at the 1986 Commonwealth Games was held on 2 August at the Meadowbank Stadium in Edinburgh.

Results

References

Athletics at the 1986 Commonwealth Games
1986